Herne Hill is an administrative division of the London Borough of Lambeth, England. It is located in Herne Hill and contains Brockwell Park, Ruskin Park and Herne Hill railway station. Loughborough Junction railway station and King's College Hospital are also partially located within the ward. At the 2011 Census the population of the ward was 15,107.

Herne Hill ward is located in the Dulwich and West Norwood Parliamentary constituency.

Lambeth Council elections 

 
 

 -->

References

External links
Lambeth Borough Council profile for the ward
Lambeth map of the ward
Herne Hill ward election results on Lambeth website
Herne Hill Conservatives' blog
We Love Herne Hill - Herne Hill Labour blog
Herne Hill Green Party

Wards of the London Borough of Lambeth
Herne Hill